The 2016 Georgia Swarm season is the first season of the Georgia Swarm, a lacrosse team based in Duluth, Georgia playing in the National Lacrosse League. The team was formerly based in Saint Paul, Minnesota and was known as the Minnesota Swarm.

Regular season

Final standings

Game log

Playoffs

Roster

Transactions

Trades

Entry Draft
The 2015 NLL Entry Draft took place on September 28, 2015. The Swarm made the following selections:

See also
2016 NLL season

References

Georgia Swarm
Georgia Swarm
Lacrosse in the United States
Georgia Swarm seasons